Biladi Sport Club, is an Iraqi football team based in Baghdad, that plays in the Iraq Division Three.

Managerial history
 Saeed Hameed
 Mahmoud Shaker Sheheet

See also
 2012–13 Iraq FA Cup
 2016–17 Iraq FA Cup
 2018–19 Iraq FA Cup
 2019–20 Iraq FA Cup
 2020–21 Iraq FA Cup
 2021–22 Iraq FA Cup

References

External links
 Biladi SC on Goalzz.com
 Iraq Clubs- Foundation Dates

2005 establishments in Iraq
Association football clubs established in 2005
Football clubs in Baghdad